Susannah Taylor or Susannah Cook (29 March 1755 – June, 1823) was a British socialite and correspondent.

Life
Susannah was the daughter of John Cook and Aramathea Maria Phillips. She was born in Norwich in 1755.

In 1777 she married John Taylor who was a businessman and hymn writer. Their home was a radical social gathering.  Guests included Sir James Edward Smith, the botanist, Henry Crabb Robinson, the barrister, Robert Southey, poet laureate, Cecilia Windham, wife of William Windham, and Sir James Mackintosh. Mackintosh described the house as a "haven" with Susannah described as intelligent and knowledgeable.

Others guests at the house were William Enfield, and some early supporters of the French Revolution: Edward Rigby, James Alderson and his daughter Amelia. Susannah was said to have danced for joy when she heard of the storming of the Bastille. Susannah was called Madame Roland by her close friends as she was said to look like the French revolutionist.

John and Susannah raised seven children to be honest, to avoid debt, and to take control of their business dealings. Their children were John (1779–1863);, Richard (1781–1858), Edward (1784–1863), Philip (1786–1870); Susan (b. 1788), married Henry Reeve, Arthur (b. 1790), a printer and F.S.A., author of The Glory of Regality (London, 1820), and Papers in relation to the Antient Topography of the Eastern Counties (London, 1869), and Sarah, wife of John Austin, the jurist. Susannah was responsible for the education of her daughters.

Susannah died in June 1823 and there is a memorial to her and her husband inside the Octagon Chapel, Norwich.

References

1755 births
1823 deaths
People from Norwich